Katarzyna Kłys (née Piłocik, 23 April 1986) is a Polish judoka. She represented Poland in the 70 kg event of the 2008 Summer Olympics and lost in the quarter-finals to Ronda Rousey. Four years later, she lost her first round match to Chen Fei in the 70 kg event of the 2012 Summer Olympics. Kłys is a two-time silver medalist in her weight class at the European championships (2007 and 2012). She won another silver medal in the team event of the 2010 European Judo Championships.

References

External links

 
 

1986 births
Living people
Polish female judoka
Judoka at the 2008 Summer Olympics
Judoka at the 2012 Summer Olympics
Judoka at the 2016 Summer Olympics
Olympic judoka of Poland
Sportspeople from Bielsko-Biała
European Games competitors for Poland
Judoka at the 2015 European Games
21st-century Polish women